Capnodium ramosum is sooty mold widespread in India that affects mangos. Honeydew secreted by aphids and other insects attracts the mold, making it quickly spread.

References

Fungal plant pathogens and diseases
Mango tree diseases
Capnodiaceae
Fungi of India